Antoni Pawlak (born 13 June 1951) is a Polish weightlifter. He competed at the 1976 Summer Olympics and the 1980 Summer Olympics.

References

1951 births
Living people
Polish male weightlifters
Olympic weightlifters of Poland
Weightlifters at the 1976 Summer Olympics
Weightlifters at the 1980 Summer Olympics
Sportspeople from Łódź
World Weightlifting Championships medalists
20th-century Polish people